This is a listing/catalogue raisonné of the works of the atelier or workshop of the Maître de Tronoën. It includes calvaries and crosses, individual pietà and some miscellaneous items.

Calvaries and crosses

The atelier are best known for their calvaries and that at Saint-Jean-Trolimon is one of the best known in Brittany.

One practice peculiar to the atelier was the adding of so-called "anges de douceur" to their pietàs and crucifixes. These angels would either try to make Mary more comfortable by lifting the edges of her veil away from her forehead, touch or arrange a lock of Jesus' hair, or make some other comforting tactile gesture. In the descriptions below the presence of such "anges de douceur" is mentioned.
.

Images of the Kerbreudeur calvary

Calvaries and crosses (continued)

Pietà

Miscellaneous

References

Pleyben
Buildings and structures in Finistère